The Rajya Sabha (meaning the "Council of States") is the upper house of the Parliament of India. Karnataka elects 12 seats and they are indirectly elected by the state legislators of Karnataka. The number of seats allocated to the party are determined by the number of seats a party possesses during nomination, and the party nominates a member to be voted on. Elections within the state legislatures are held using Single transferable vote with proportional representation.

Current members (2022)
Keys:

JD MP LIST

INC MP LIST

Jp/Bjp MP LIST

independent MP LIST

Indian government (Rajya Sabha) website:

References

Rajya Sabha
 
Karnataka